Marco Toscano (born 7 July 1997) is an Italian football player. He plays for  club Gubbio.

Club career
He is the product of youth teams of Palermo and played for their Under-19 squad beginning with the 2014–15 season. He made a handful of bench appearances for Palermo's senior squad in 2015–16 Serie A season, but did not see any time on the field.

He joined Serie C club Siracusa on loan for the 2016–17 season, the loan was eventually extended for the 2017–18 season as well. He made his Serie C debut for Siracusa on 2 October 2016 in a game against Melfi as a 70th-minute substitute for Liberato Filosa.

On 9 August 2018, he moved on another season-long loan to Serie C, this time to his home province club Trapani.

On 24 June 2019, he signed with Serie B club Virtus Entella.

On 31 August 2021, he joined Virtus Francavilla.

On 10 August 2022, Toscano moved to Gubbio on a two-year deal.

References

External links
 

1997 births
People from Erice
Sportspeople from the Province of Trapani
Footballers from Sicily
Living people
Italian footballers
Association football midfielders
Palermo F.C. players
Trapani Calcio players
Virtus Entella players
Virtus Francavilla Calcio players
A.S. Gubbio 1910 players
Serie B players
Serie C players